The école de musique Vincent-d'Indy is a subsidized private music college situated in Montreal, Quebec, Canada in the Outremont district, that specializes in music education.

Programs
L'école Vincent-d'Indy offers programs that result in students receiving a Diploma of College Studies (often referred to as a DEC - a Diplôme d'études collégiales) in:

Music
Music and Languages
Music and Mathematics
Music and Sciences and Nature
Music and Human Sciences
Music and Arts and Letters

The school also offers extracurricular courses in music to youth in primary and secondary school as well as to adults. It also maintains a resource of approximately 400 affiliated professors throughout Quebec.

The current Director General is Yves Petit.

History

Early 20th century
The school has its origin of program of musical studies begun by Sister Marie-Stéphane (Hélène Côté) in the school of the Congregation of Sisters of the Holy Names of Jesus and Marie (also known as Collège Jésus-Marie) in the 1920s. In 1932, the foundations were made for the École supérieure de musique d'Outremont, affiliated with the Faculty of Arts at the Université de Montréal.

Middle and late 20th Century
The school adopted its current name in 1951 on the occasion of the centenary of the birth of the French composer and pedagogue Vincent d'Indy.

The Vincent-d'Indy music school offered, up until 1978, a university program in music.

Notable faculty

Jean-Marie Beaudet
Yvonne Duckett
Yvonne Hubert
Juliette Milette
Léo-Pol Morin
Frédéric Pelletier

Notable alumni

Édith Boivin-Béluse
Jocelyne Binet
Colette Boky
Renée Claude
Micheline Coulombe Saint-Marcoux
Isabelle Delorme
Marc Durand
Emmanuëlle
Marc-André Hamelin
Daniel Hétu
Christopher Jackson
Kaya (Francis Martin)
Yves Lapierre
Andrée Lescot
Jeanne Renaud

Music Publishing division
The École de musique Vincent-d'Indy publishes and distributes its own line of educational materials for its curriculum in cooperation with the Coopérative Vincent d'Indy. The Coop is the school bookstore as well as distributor of their educational publications.

Notes and references

External links
Official Site
Information from the Web site of the Minister of Education
Book and music editions Web site

Music schools in Canada
Education in Montreal
Outremont, Quebec
Private universities and colleges in Canada
Educational institutions established in the 1920s
1920s establishments in Quebec